AASM may refer to:

 Armement Air-Sol Modulaire, a French precision guided munition
 Australian Active Service Medal
 American Academy of Sleep Medicine, a professional organization